The following table shows the European record progression in the men's 1500 metres, as ratified by the EAA.

The current European record is 3:28.32 by Jakob Ingebrigtsen of Norway, set on August 7, 2021 in the Tokyo Olympics 1500 meter final.

Hand timing 

(a) Sometimes given as 3:47.5.
(b) Sometimes given as 3:40.5.

Automatic timing 

(a) = Timed electronically at a time when records were ratified at intervals of one tenth of a second, these were considered equivalent performances.

References 

1500 m
European record
European 1500 metres record